is a hot spring resort located in the city of  Komatsu, Ishikawa Prefecture, Japan.

Awazu Onsen claims to have been founded by the shugendō monk Taichō in the Nara period under the command of the mountain deity Hakusan Daigongen. Taichō was a native of neighbouring Echizen Province and is said to have been the first person to have claimed Mount Hakusan, from which the hot springs at Awazu Onsen have their source. Although it is a small resort with few more than ten ryokan, each inn has its own well, rather than using a common source. The Hōshi Ryokan, founded in 718 AD was recorded in the Guinness Book of World Records as the world's oldest hot spring innfounded in 705.

See also 
 Hōshi Ryokan

References

External links

  
JNTO site

Hot springs of Ishikawa Prefecture
Tourist attractions in Ishikawa Prefecture
Spa towns in Japan
Komatsu, Ishikawa